The Fourth Development Cabinet was the Indonesian cabinet which served under President Suharto and Vice President Umar Wirahadikusumah from March 1983 until March 1988. The Cabinet was formed after Suharto was elected to a 4th term as President by the People's Consultative Assembly (MPR).

The Five Cabinet Aims
Intensifying the Development Trilogy with the support of a stronger National Resilience.
Intensifying administrative reform and aiming towards a clean and legitimate Government.
Intensifying the institutionalization of Pancasila in developing Pancasila Democracy and the Guide to Learn and Apply Pancasila (P4) and to strengthen the unity and oneness of the Nation.
Intensifying the free and active foreign policy for the sake of National Interest.
Holding a direct, universal, free, and secret Legislative Election in 1987.

President and Vice President
President: Gen. (ret.) Suharto
Vice President: Gen. (ret.) Umar Wirahadikusumah

Coordinating Ministers
Coordinating Minister of Politics and Security: Gen. (ret.) Surono
Coordinating Minister of Economics, Finance, Industry and Development Supervision: Ali Wardhana
Coordinating Minister of People's Welfare: Lt. Gen. (ret.) Alamsjah Prawiranegara

Departmental Ministers
Minister of Home Affairs: Lt. Gen. Supardjo Rustam
Minister of Foreign Affairs: Mochtar Kusumaatmadja
Minister of Defense and Security: Gen. (ret.) Poniman
Minister of Justice: Ali Said
Minister of Information: Harmoko
Minister of Finance: Radius Prawiro
Minister of Trade: Rachmat Saleh
Minister of Cooperatives: Lt. Gen. (ret.) Bustanil Arifin
Minister of Agriculture: Achmad Affandi
Minister of Forestry: Soedjarwo
Minister of Industry: Hartarto Sastrosoenarto
Minister of Mines and Energy: Subroto
Minister of Public Works: Suyono Sosrodarsono
Minister of Transportation: Air Marshal (ret.) Rusmin Nuryadin
Minister of Tourism, Post, and Telecommunication: Lt. Gen. (ret.) Achmad Tahir
Minister of Manpower: Admiral (ret.) Sudomo
Minister of Transmigration: Martono
Minister of Education and Culture: Brig. Gen. (Hon) Nugroho Notosusanto
Minister of Health: Suwardjono Suryaningrat
Minister of Religious Affairs: Munawir Sjadzali
Minister of Social Affairs: Nani Sudarsono

State Ministers
State Minister/State Secretary: Lt. Gen. (ret.) Sudharmono
State Minister of National Development Planning/Chairman of the National Development Planning Body (BAPPENAS): J. B. Sumarlin
State Minister of Research and Technology/Chairman of the Research and Implementation of Technology Board (BPPT): B. J. Habibie
State Minister of Population and Environment: Emil Salim
State Minister of Housing: Cosmas Batubara
State Minister of Youth and Sports: Lt. Col. Abdul Gafur
State Minister of State Apparatus Utilization/Vice Chairman of BAPPENAS: Saleh Afiff
State Minister of Female Empowerment: L. Soetanto

Junior Ministers
Junior Minister/Cabinet Secretary: Brig. Gen. Murdiono
Junior Minister of the Intensification of Consumption of Nationally-made Goods: Ginandjar Kartasasmita
Junior Minister of the Intensification of Foodstuffs Production: Wardojo
Junior Minister of the Intensification of Hard Plants Production: Hasjrul Harahap
Junior Minister of the Intensification of Animal Husbandry and Fisheries Production: J. H. Hutasoit

Officials With ministerial status
Attorney General: Ismael Saleh
Governor of the Central Bank: Arifin M. Siregar
Commander of the Armed Forces: Gen. Benny Moerdani

Changes
June 1985: Nugroho Notosusanto died and was replaced by Fuad Hassan as Minister of Education and Culture.
L. Soesanto died and was replaced by A. S. Murpratomo as State Minister of Female Empowerment.
February 1988: Benny Moerdani was replaced as Commander of ABRI by General Try Sutrisno.

References

Notes

New Order (Indonesia)
Cabinets of Indonesia
1983 establishments in Indonesia
1988 disestablishments in Indonesia
Cabinets established in 1983
Cabinets disestablished in 1988
Suharto